Nieuw-Weerdinge is a village in the Netherlands and is part of the Emmen municipality in Drenthe.

History 
Nieuw-Weerdinge started as a peat exploitation settlement. It was founded in 1872, and was originally called Weerdingermarke. In 1902, it was renamed Nieuw-Weerdinge. In 1932, it was home to 4,466 people.

References 

Populated places in Drenthe
Emmen, Netherlands
1872 establishments in the Netherlands